Ahmed Zeghdar (born 17 April 1966 in Algiers) is the Algerian Minister of Industry. He was appointed as minister on 9 September 2022.

Education 
Zeghdar holds a Magister in Economic Sciences (1998), a Diploma in Chartered Accountant (2001) and a Doctorate in Economics (2005) from the Algiers 1 University.

References 

1966 births
21st-century Algerian politicians
Algerian politicians
Government ministers of Algeria
Industry ministers of Algeria

Living people
University of Algiers alumni